Nanva Kola (also Romanized as Nānvā Kolā) is a village in Natel-e Restaq Rural District, Chamestan District, Nur County, Mazandaran Province, Iran. At the 2006 census, its population was 160, in 42 families.

References 

Populated places in Nur County